Giedlarowa  is a village in the administrative district of Gmina Leżajsk, within Leżajsk County, Subcarpathian Voivodeship, in south-eastern Poland.

The village has a population of 4,096.

Giedlarowa - a village in Poland located in Podkarpackie province, in the county Leżajsk, in the municipality Leżajsk.
In the years 1973-1976 the village was the seat of the municipality Giedlarowa. In the years 1975-1998 was a village located in the Rzeszów region.
Located in the foothills east of the Plateau Kolbuszowa. Occupies an area of 2,995.99 hectares and dates back some 4 thousand. residents. Flow through the village of two rivers: Mud and Radejówka. In the seventies, started the operation of local natural gas resources.
Giedlarowa is one of the country invested in a great neighborhood Lizhensk colonization action from the turn of the fourteenth and fifteenth centuries. January 10, 1409 Giedlar year Santa has received from the lessee the privilege of locating deposits of Cracow under German law in the valley Rzeczicha (now Mud). In the same year he was confirmed by staying in the vicinity of King Wladyslaw Jagiello. The first mayor was Nicholas Giedlar. To date, the foundation document is preserved along with the number of copies:
240 1440, March 10, Kraków
feria quinta post dominicam Letare
Third, the Polish king Ladislaus, elect the kingdom of Hungary, as well as the Kraków, Sandomierz, Sieradz, Łęczyca, Kujawy, the highest prince of Lithuania, Mr. and heir of Pomerania and Ruthenia, at the request of John of the village elder Kunaszowej Giedlarowa transumuje son Nicholas document Drogosz tenutariusza Krzeszów issued 18 Jan 1409 years in Lezajsk Instructing Nicholas Giedlarowi bourgeois leżajskiemu deposition on the raw root Giedlarowa riverside village Rzeczychą. Witnesses: Zbigniew bishop of Kraków, John Bishop of Chelm, Jan Chizhov Castellan of Cracow, Jan Teczyno governor of Kraków, Sedziwoj Ostroroga governor of Poznan, Albert from Little Łęczyca governor, Dobrogost of Szamotuły Castellan of Poznan, Lawrence Zaremba Kalinowe Castellan of Sieradz. Datum per manus ... Johannis de Polonia cancellarii Conyeczpolye Regni et Petri de Sczekoczin vicecancellarii. Ad relacion ... Johannis de Polonia cancellarii Conyeczpolye Regni.
Env.: Warsaw, AGAD, doc. Perg. No. 4765 (transumpt King Sigismund the Old of 31 July 1525).
Ed.: CRB II 553rd
Reg.: MatArch. 111.
In Giedlarowa born twice Sejm Marshal Jozef Zych.
There is a parish dedicated to Saint Michael the Archangel and two sports clubs and KS Giedlarowa UKS Victoria Marathon Giedlarowa. Countryside has about 8 km in length.

References

External links
 Parish Giedlarowa
 Schools in Giedlarowa

Villages in Leżajsk County